Polymyositis (PM) is a type of chronic inflammation of the muscles (inflammatory myopathy) related to dermatomyositis and inclusion body myositis. Its name means "inflammation of many muscles" (poly- + myos- + -itis). The inflammation of polymyositis is mainly found in the endomysial layer of skeletal muscle, whereas dermatomyositis is characterized primarily by inflammation of the perimysial layer of skeletal muscles.

Signs and symptoms
The hallmark of polymyositis is weakness and/or loss of muscle mass in the proximal musculature, as well as flexion of the neck and torso. These symptoms can be associated with marked pain in these areas as well. The hip extensors are often severely affected, leading to particular difficulty in climbing stairs and rising from a seated position. The skin involvement of dermatomyositis is absent in polymyositis. Dysphagia (difficulty swallowing) or other problems with esophageal motility occur in as many as 1/3 of patients. Low grade fever and enlarged lymph nodes may be present. Foot drop in one or both feet can be a symptom of advanced polymyositis and inclusion body myositis. The systemic involvement of polymyositis includes interstitial lung disease (ILD) and heart disease, such as heart failure and conduction abnormalities.

Polymyositis tends to become evident in adulthood, presenting with bilateral proximal muscle weakness often noted in the upper legs due to early fatigue while walking. Sometimes the weakness presents itself as an inability to rise from a seated position without help or an inability to raise one's arms above one's head. The weakness is generally progressive, accompanied by lymphocytic inflammation (mainly cytotoxic T cells).

Associated illnesses
Polymyositis and the associated inflammatory myopathies have an associated increased risk of cancer. The features they found associated with an increased risk of cancer were older age, age greater than 45, male sex, difficulty swallowing, death of skin cells, cutaneous vasculitis, rapid onset of myositis (<4 weeks), elevated creatine kinase, higher erythrocyte sedimentation rate and higher C-reactive protein levels. Several factors were associated with lower-than-average risk, including the presence of interstitial lung disease, joint inflammation/joint pain, Raynaud's syndrome, or anti-Jo-1 antibody. The malignancies that are associated are nasopharyngeal cancer, lung cancer, non-Hodgkin's lymphoma and bladder cancer, amongst others.

Cardiac involvement manifests itself typically as heart failure and is present in up to 77% of patients.
Interstitial lung disease is found in up to 65% of patients with polymyositis, as defined by HRCT or restrictive ventilatory defects compatible with interstitial lung disease.

Causes
Polymyositis is an inflammatory myopathy mediated by cytotoxic T cells with an as yet unknown autoantigen, while dermatomyositis is a humorally mediated angiopathy resulting in myositis and a typical dermatitis.

The cause of polymyositis is unknown and may involve viruses and autoimmune factors. Cancer may trigger polymyositis and dermatomyositis, possibly through an immune reaction against cancer that also attacks a component of muscles. There is tentative evidence of an association with celiac disease.

Diagnosis
Diagnosis is fourfold: History and physical examination, elevation of creatine kinase, electromyograph (EMG) alteration, and a positive muscle biopsy.

The hallmark clinical feature of polymyositis is proximal muscle weakness, with less important findings being muscle pain and dysphagia. Cardiac and pulmonary findings will be present in approximately 25% of cases of patients with polymyositis.

Sporadic inclusion body myositis (sIBM) is often misdiagnosed as polymyositis or dermatomyositis but it can be differentiated as myositis that does not respond to treatment is likely IBM. sIBM comes on over months to years; polymyositis comes on over weeks to months. Polymyositis tends to respond well to treatment, at least initially; IBM does not.

Treatment
The first line treatment for polymyositis is corticosteroids. Specialized exercise therapy may supplement treatment to enhance quality of life.

Epidemiology
Polymyositis strikes females with greater frequency than males.

Polymyositis as a distinct diagnosis
The discovery of several myositis-specific autoantibodies during the past decades has enabled the description of other discrete subsets of diagnosis, specifically the discovery of Antisynthetase syndrome in reducing the number of diagnoses of polymyositis.

Society and culture

Notable cases 
 Dan Christensen, painter of abstract art. Died due to heart failure caused by polymyositis.
 Robert Erickson, American composer and teacher who was a leading modernist exponent of "12-tone" composition. Died from the effects of polymyositis.
 David Lean, film director.
 Eric Samuelsen, playwright.
 Victor Manuel Resendiz Ruiz, wrestler.
 Cardinal John Wright
 Rosita Velazquez, Puerto Rican actress and singer.

See also
 Limb girdle syndrome

References

External links 

Inflammations
Steroid-responsive inflammatory conditions
Systemic connective tissue disorders